Lalit Sen (21 April 1932 - 18 October 1985) was an Indian politician from Himachal Pradesh.  He was elected to the Lok Sabha, the lower house of the Parliament of India, from the Mandi constituency, as a member of the Indian National Congress. He was a student of Bishop Cotton School, Shimla and did his degree from St. Stephen's College, Delhi.

Lalit Sen was the 51st titular Raja of the erstwhile princely state of Suket. His father was Raja Lakshman Sen Bahadur, the last ruling king of Suket. After his death, he was nominally succeeded to the throne of Suket by his son Hari Sen.

References

External links
Official biographical sketch in Parliament of India website

1932 births

1985 deaths
Lok Sabha members from Himachal Pradesh
India MPs 1962–1967
India MPs 1967–1970
Indian National Congress politicians

Indian royalty

Bishop Cotton School Shimla alumni
St. Stephen's College, Delhi alumni